Derek John Somerset Taylor (born 12 November 1942) is a former English cricketer who played for Somerset, Surrey and Griqualand West as a wicket-keeper batsman.

Taylor holds the record for the most dismissals in a List A cricket match, tied with Steve Palframan and Jamie Pipe, having taken eight catches in a 1982 game against British Universities.

Taylor's twin brother Mike Taylor played for Nottinghamshire and Hampshire.

References

External links
 
 

1942 births
Living people
English cricketers
Surrey cricketers
Somerset cricketers
Griqualand West cricketers
Buckinghamshire cricketers
Marylebone Cricket Club cricketers
Twin sportspeople
English twins
Wicket-keepers